Ivan Vukomanović (born 19 June 1977) is a Serbian professional football manager and former player who is the current head coach of Indian Super League club Kerala Blasters.

Playing career
Vukomanović played as a defender during his playing days. He was also used as a defensive midfielder. He started his professional career at Serbian club FK Sloboda Užice. Vukomanović later played for Obilić, where he won the 1997–98 First League of FR Yugoslavia title. Vukomanović then moved to the Ligue 1 side Bordeaux. With the French club, he won the 1998–99 French Division 1. Throughout his career, he played for several top tier clubs, which includes the Serbian side Red Star Belgrade, Bundesliga’s FC Köln, Belgian side Royal Antwerp F.C and Russian club FC Dynamo Moscow. With Red Star Belgrade, he had won the 1999–2000 and 2000–01 season of First League of FR Yugoslavia along with the FR Yugoslavia Cup in 2000. Vukamanovic fully retired from professional football in 2011 at the age of 34. At the national level, he had represented FR Yugoslavia national under-21 football team.

Managerial career

Standard Liège
Vukomanović started his coaching career at Belgian Pro League club Standard Liège, where he assisted Guy Luzon ahead of the club's 2013-14 season. During this time, Leige played the Europa League after winning all the games in the qualifying stages. Following Luzon’s exit in October 2014, Vukomanović took charge as their head coach. His first game ever game as a head coach was against Spanish giants Sevilla in the Europa League, where the match ended in a goalless draw. Under his coaching, Standard Liege picked 28 out of a possible 39 points in the league. On February 2015, despite getting some good results, the club replaced him with Jose Riga midway into the season citing lack of experience as a head coach. He was offered the assistant manager role under Riga, to which he responded; "To propose to me to remain in the staff, it is only to be politically correct towards the players and the supporters. I could have been fake and say yes. Tap Riga on the shoulder and then do nothing but I'm not like that. I'm a straightforward, honest person. So I decided to leave Standard".

Slovan Bratislava
In 2016, Vukomanović was appointed as the manager of the Slovak Super Liga side Slovan Bratislava. Under his helm, the club finished second-place finish in the league. His first title as a manager came in 2017, where he guided Slovan Bratislava to the 2017–18 Slovak Cup title. Vukomanović had a decent second season Slovan Bratislava. With just five defeats from 22 games, he parted ways with the club following a draw against FK Senica on 28 October 2017.

Apollon Limassol
After a two year hiatus, Vukomanović returned to coaching in September 2019 by signing with Cypriot First Division club Apollon Limassol as their interim head coach and led them in four matches.

Kerala Blasters

2021–22: Appoinment and ISL finals 
On 17 June 2021, Kerala Blasters announced that Vukomanović has been appointed as the Indian Super League club's new head coach ahead of the 2021–22 season. Under Vukomanović, Kerala Blasters won their first game of the season in the 2021 Durand Cup match against Indian Navy with a score of 0–1 on 11 September 2021. His first Indian Super League match as the manager of Kerala Blasters ended in 4–2 defeat on 19 November against ATK Mohun Bagan FC. The following two games saw Blasters drawing against NorthEast United FC and Bengaluru FC respectively. It was on 5 December that Vukomanović's Blasters side saw their first league win as they defeated Odisha FC by 2–1 at full-time, and helped Kerala Blasters to seal their first Indian Super League victory in 11 months. The Blasters' then won back-to-back games against defending champions Mumbai City FC and against rivals Chennaiyin FC, and made it to the top four in the table. The Blasters' unbeaten streak under Vukomanović continued, and they moved to the top of the table for the first time in eight years during the mid-season after the 1–0 victory over Hyderabad FC on 9 January 2022. Under his management, the Blasters qualified for the ISL finals for the first time since 2016 after beating Jamshedpur FC 2–1 on aggregate score from both legs. They faced Hyderabad in the final on 20 March, which they lost in penalty shoot-out. The club reached numerous milestones during the season including a 10-match unbeaten run which made them climb to the top of the table for the first time in its history. The Blasters also recorded its highest goals scored, highest points obtained, highest number of wins and least number of losses. They also achieved a positive goal difference for the first time in the club's history.

2022–23: Contract extension 
On 4 April, the club announced the contract extension of Vukomanović for three more years until 2025. It was the first time that the club has renewed the contract of a first-team head coach since its inception in 2014. The 2022–23 Indian Super League began on a high note with a 3–1 victory over SC East Bengal on 7 October 2022 which was also his first home game as the Blasters manager after the regular home-away format returned after the Covid-19 regulation. Despite of this, the Blasters suffered three defeats in a row. They came back to the winning ways after defeating NorthEast United FC 3–0 on 5 November in an away game. On 13 November, the Blasters broke FC Goa's unbeaten six year run against them after a 3–1 win. This also marked Vukomanović's 14th win as the manager of the Blasters and broke David James' record for most number of wins for the club. On 19 November, he became the first manager in the history of the club to record three consecutive win after defeating Hyderabad 1–0 in an away game. On 3 February 2023, Vukamanovic served his 42nd game as the manager of Kerala Blasters and broke David James' record of managing the most number of games for the club. On 7 February, the Blasters registered their 10th win during the 2022–23 Indian Super League season after defeating Chennaiyin FC 2–1 at home. This was the first time in their history that the club won 10 games in a season. On 16 February, the Blasters qualified for the 2022–23 season playoffs, making Vukamanovic the first manager in the club's history to lead them into consecutive playoffs. On 3 March, the Blasters played against Bengaluru FC in the playoffs which was subjected to controversy. Sunil Chhetri scored a controversial free-kick goal in the 96th minute. Following the goal, the Blasters players walked-off the pitch after Vukomanović called them off from the pitch. Kerala Blasters forfeited the match after claiming that the referee Crystal John did not blow the whistle before Chhetri took the kick and the players were not ready. The next day, Vukamanovic and the whole team received a warm welcome at the Kochi airport with the chants of “Ivan, Ivan,” and “we are with you”. Kerala Blasters later alleged that the referee asked Luna to move away from ball and hence the free kick should have only been allowed following a whistle. The club also asked for a ban on the referee Crystal John.

Managerial statistics

Honours

Player
Obilić
 First League of FR Yugoslavia: 1997–98

Red Star Belgrade
 First League of FR Yugoslavia: 1999–2000, 2000–01
 FR Yugoslavia Cup: 1999–2000

Bordeaux
 French Division 1: 1998–99

Manager
Slovan Bratislava
 Slovak Cup: 2017–18

Kerala Blasters
 Indian Super League runner-up: 2021–22

References

External links
 R.A.F.C.-Museum
 
 
 

1. FC Köln players
Association football defenders
Apollon Limassol FC managers
Belgian Pro League players
Belgian Pro League managers
Challenger Pro League players
Bundesliga players
Expatriate football managers in Belgium
Expatriate football managers in Slovakia
Expatriate footballers in Belgium
Expatriate footballers in China
Expatriate footballers in France
Expatriate footballers in Germany
Expatriate footballers in Israel
Expatriate footballers in Russia
FC Dynamo Moscow players
FC Girondins de Bordeaux players
FC Spartak Vladikavkaz players
First League of Serbia and Montenegro players
FK Obilić players
FK Rad players
FK Sloboda Užice players
Israeli Premier League players
K.S.C. Lokeren Oost-Vlaanderen players
Ligue 1 players
Maccabi Herzliya F.C. players
Qingdao Hainiu F.C. (1990) players
Red Star Belgrade footballers
Royal Antwerp F.C. players
Russian Premier League players
Serbia and Montenegro under-21 international footballers
Serbian expatriate football managers
Serbian expatriate footballers
Serbian expatriate sportspeople in Belgium
Serbian expatriate sportspeople in China
Serbian expatriate sportspeople in France
Serbian expatriate sportspeople in Germany
Serbian expatriate sportspeople in Israel
Serbian expatriate sportspeople in Russia
Serbian expatriate sportspeople in Slovakia
Serbian football managers
Serbian footballers
ŠK Slovan Bratislava managers
Slovak Super Liga managers
Sportspeople from Užice
Standard Liège managers
1977 births
Living people
Kerala Blasters FC head coaches
Indian Super League head coaches